The 2017 Grand Prix Zagreb Open, was a wrestling event held in Zagreb, Croatia between 11–12 March 2017.

Medal table

Team ranking

Greco-Roman

Participating nations

91 competitors from 15 nations participated.
 (2)
 (3)
 (1)
 (14)
 (5)
 (1)
 (6)
 (1)
 (9)
 (6)
 (5)
 (8)
 (14)
 (3)
 (13)

References 

Grand Prix Zagreb Open
Grand Prix Zagreb Open
International wrestling competitions hosted by Croatia
Sport in Zagreb
Wrestling in Croatia
Grand Prix Zagreb Open